The Hiranbaz are a Muslim community found in the state of Rajasthan in India. They are also known as Mertia or Mertia Qasai.

Origin and present circumstances

The Hiranbaz are sub-group within the Qassab community. Their name literally means a deer hunter, and they were employed as professional deer hunters by the rulers of Bikaner. They trace their origin to the town of Merta in Nagaur District, and are now found in Bikaner District. The Hiranbaz speak Marwari, and many now also speak Urdu. They are divided into a number of clans, the main ones being the Solanki and Panwar. The community used to practice clan exogamy, but this practice has been abandoned.

The Hiranbaz are now known as Qureshi, which is also used as a surname by the community. They are still employed as butchers, but many are now peasant cultivators.

See also

 Qassab

References

Social groups of Rajasthan
Shaikh clans
Muslim communities of India
Social groups of Pakistan
Muslim communities of Rajasthan